The Magritte Award for Best Costume Design (French: Magritte des meilleurs costumes) is an award presented annually by the Académie André Delvaux. It is one of the Magritte Awards, which were established to recognize excellence in Belgian cinematic achievements.

The 1st Magritte Awards ceremony was held in 2011 with Christophe Pidre and Florence Scholtes receiving the award for their work in Sister Smile. As of the 2022 ceremony, Frédérick Denis is the most recent winner in this category for his work in Madly in Life.

Winners and nominees
In the list below, winners are listed first in the colored row, followed by the other nominees.

2010s

2020s

References

External links
 Magritte Awards official website
 Magritte Award for Best Costume Design at AlloCiné

2011 establishments in Belgium
Awards established in 2011
Awards for film costume design
Costume Design